Table Bay is a natural bay and former community on the coast of Labrador in the province of Newfoundland and Labrador, Canada. It drains into the Labrador Sea to the east.

History
Table Bay is also the name of a former settlement on the coast of the bay.

In October 1796, Table Bay was the site of the sinking of the British ship Regulator by the French Navy.

References

Ghost towns in Newfoundland and Labrador
Bays of Newfoundland and Labrador